Sumlin is a surname. Notable people with the surname include:

Bernice I. Sumlin (1926–2018), American educator
Hubert Sumlin (1931–2011), Chicago blues guitarist and singer
Kevin Sumlin (born 1964), American football player and coach

See also